Puma Ranra (Quechua puma cougar, puma, ranra stony, stony place, also spelled Pumarangra) is a mountain in the Cordillera Central in the Andes of Peru which reaches an altitude of approximately . It is situated in the Lima Region, Yauyos Province, in the districts of Huantan and Laraos.

References

Mountains of Peru
Mountains of Lima Region